Almond is an unincorporated community in Swain County, North Carolina, United States.

History
Almond has a post office with ZIP code 28702, which opened on March 17, 1886. The community was named for Bud Almond, who provided the land on which the town was founded.  At one time, Almond was a scheduled stop with a depot for the Southern Railway on the Murphy Branch.

During the construction of Fontana Dam, the post office, school, and railway depot located here were moved during 1943. Today, most of Almond is now covered by Fontana Lake.

References

Unincorporated communities in Swain County, North Carolina
Unincorporated communities in North Carolina